The 41 class were a class of diesel locomotives built by British Thomson-Houston in the United Kingdom for the New South Wales Department of Railways in 1953 and 1954.

History

In 1950, the New South Wales Government Railways ordered 10 diesel locomotives from Australian General Electric. The construction was sublet to British Thomson-Houston of Rugby in the United Kingdom with the body built by Metro Cammell, Birmingham. The first entered service in December 1953 and the last in February 1955. All were delivered painted in verdant green, in the 1960s all were repainted Indian red.

From their earliest days, the locomotives suffered failures including overheating and fires. To try and overcome this the radiators were relocated further to the ends of all ten of the locomotives and air ducting was modified.  In addition, two had their mufflers relocated. The modification was considered a success, but not rolled out across the rest of the class. The locomotives were equipped to operate in multiple however the cooling system layout saw radiator heat passing from the leading locomotive to the trailing one, resulting in the equipment being removed.

By the early 1960s with the twin Paxman 12-RPHL engines coming to the end of their useful life, the Mechanical Branch began looking at repowering options. With the cost of repowering and overhauling the Class 41s being two-thirds that of a new Class 48 and repair costs per mile over nine times greater, it was decided not to proceed with this.

One was set aside in December 1957 following two electrical fires, the second in April 1961, the third in September 1969, while overhauls ceased for the rest of the class in 1972 with each locomotive withdrawn as it suffered a major failure, the final locomotive being withdrawn in June 1975. The class were mainly confined to metropolitan Sydney operating local trip workings and shunting at Enfield yard.

Preservation
In December 1976, 4102 was placed by the Public Transport Commission in the custody of the NSW Rail Museum and is now a designated NSW heritage item.

After it arrived at Thirlmere in January 1977, the seized engine that led to its demise was temporarily repaired by members of the Illawarra Group. In 1982, an engine failed whilst returning from a trip to Picton and as a consequence 4102 was then used as a one-engine shunter until the batteries finally wore out in 1987.

By July 1991, it had moved to CountryLink's XPT Service Centre in Sydenham (where the Paxman engined XPTs are maintained), where a spare engine was installed. It returned to Thirlmere in November 1992, but was not restored to service. In April 2009, 4102 was moved for further storage at the Broadmeadow Locomotive Depot where it remains to this day.

Status table

References

Further reading

Bo-Bo locomotives
BTH locomotives
Diesel locomotives of New South Wales
Railway locomotives introduced in 1953
Standard gauge locomotives of Australia
Diesel-electric locomotives of Australia